Niet Molotoff is a Finnish propaganda song composed during the Winter War to mock the Soviet invaders. It was composed by Matti Jurva and the lyrics were written by Tatu Pekkarinen. Jurva first recorded the song in 1942 with a group named Kristalli-Tanssiorkesteri conducted by George de Godzinsky. The orchestral accompaniment of the recording was arranged by Robert von Essen.

The song ridicules Soviet foreign affairs minister Vyacheslav Molotov, comparing him to Nikolay Bobrikov, a tsarist official who was murdered for his attempts to institute Russification policies in Finland. The chorus lambasts Molotov for "lying more than Bobrikov himself" in response to Molotov's justifications for the invasion, while the rest of the song mocks the Soviet expectations of a smooth conquest and also derides Joseph Stalin "and other charlatans".

The song's melody is based on that of the Russian folk song Ukhar-kupets (Ухарь-купец).

It was re-recorded by Solistiyhtye Suomi as Njet Molotoff in 1989.

In 2022, as a result of the Russian invasion of Ukraine, a Ukrainian version of the song called "Njet Vladimir", referring to Vladimir Putin, was created.

See also
Chukhna, an old Russian slur for Finns referenced in the song

References 

Propaganda songs
Finnish songs
1942 songs
Continuation War
Songs about the military
Songs of World War II
Cultural depictions of Russian men
Cultural depictions of politicians
Songs about politicians
Anti-communist propaganda
Winter War in popular culture